Amauroderma subsessile is a polypore fungus in the family Ganodermataceae. It was described as a new species in 2015 by mycologists Allyne Christina Gomes-Silva, Leif Ryvarden, and Tatiana Gibertoni. The specific epithet subsessile (from the Latin words sub "somewhat" and sessilis = "without a stipe") refers to "the basidiomata not completely sessile, with a short to long stipe". A. subsessile is found in the states of Rondônia and Pará in the Brazilian Amazon, as well as Costa Rica and Panama.

References

subsessile
Fungi described in 2015
Fungi of Central America
Fungi of Brazil
Taxa named by Leif Ryvarden